Euphranor of Corinth (middle of the 4th century BC) was a Greek artist who excelled both as a sculptor and as a painter.

Pliny the Elder provides a list of his works including a cavalry battle, a Theseus, and the feigned madness of Odysseus among the paintings; and Paris, Leto with her children Apollo and Artemis, and Philip and Alexander in chariots among the statues.

No known existing statues have been identified as copies from works of Euphranor (but see a series of attributions by Six in Jahrbuch, 1909, 7 foil.). His work appears to have resembled that of his contemporary Lysippus, notably in the attention he paid to symmetry, in his preference for bodily forms slighter than those usual in earlier art, and in his love of heroic subjects. He wrote a (now lost) treatise on proportions.

He was a contemporary of Antorides, and, like him, studied under Ariston.

References

Attribution:

Ancient Greek painters
4th-century BC Greek sculptors
Ancient Greek sculptors
Ancient Corinthians
4th-century BC painters